Sam Tolchard (born 27 May 1989) is an English international lawn and indoor bowler.

Profile
In 2009, he won the singles and triples silver medals at the Atlantic Bowls Championships and the following year in 2010, he won the Hong Kong International Bowls Classic pairs title with Robert Newman.

He competed for England in the men's pairs at the 2014 Commonwealth Games where he won a bronze medal.

He was selected as part of the English team for the 2018 Commonwealth Games on the Gold Coast in Queensland where he claimed a bronze medal in the Fours with David Bolt, Jamie Chestney and Louis Ridout.

In 2019, he won the triples bronze medal at the Atlantic Bowls Championships and in 2020 he was selected for the 2020 World Outdoor Bowls Championship in Australia. In 2022, he competed in the men's pairs and the men's fours at the 2022 Commonwealth Games. Partnering Jamie Walker he won the pairs silver medal, losing out to Wales in the final and in the fours he also secured a bronze medal.

In November 2022, he won the gold medal at the World Singles Champion of Champions in Wellington, New Zealand.

National Achievements
He has won eight National Championship titles, including six singles titles. He bowls outdoors for Kings BC, who have won the Top Club championship four years running from 2016–2019.

National titles
2007 Bowls England National Championships (Men's Champion of Champions)
2008 Bowls England National Championships (Men's Singles Four Wood)
2016 Bowls England National Championships (Men's Pairs)
2016 Bowls England National Championships (Men's Singles Two Wood)
2019 Bowls England National Championships (Men's Champion of Champions)
2021 Bowls England National Championships (Men's Singles Four Wood)
2021 Bowls England National Championships (Men's Singles Two Wood)
2022 Bowls England National Championships (Men's Singles Two Wood)

Personal life and family
Tolchard is the brother of England international bowler Sophie Tolchard. His father, Ray Tolchard, played cricket for Devon and was a first-class cricket umpire, and his uncle Roger Tolchard played Test cricket for England and county cricket for Leicestershire. Another uncle, Jeffrey Tolchard, also played cricket for Leicestershire and played football for Torquay United and Exeter City.

References

External links
 
  (2010–2014)
 
 
 

1989 births
Living people
English male bowls players
Commonwealth Games medallists in lawn bowls
Commonwealth Games silver medallists for England
Commonwealth Games bronze medallists for England
Bowls players at the 2010 Commonwealth Games
Bowls players at the 2014 Commonwealth Games
Bowls players at the 2018 Commonwealth Games
Bowls players at the 2022 Commonwealth Games
Sportspeople from Torquay
Medallists at the 2014 Commonwealth Games
Medallists at the 2018 Commonwealth Games
Medallists at the 2022 Commonwealth Games